The 2020 Wisconsin State Senate elections were taking place as part of the biennial 2020 United States elections. Wisconsin voters elected state senators in 16 of the state's 33 senate districts. State senators serve four-year terms in the Wisconsin State Senate, with roughly half of the seats up for election every two years. The primary elections on August 11, 2020, determined which candidates will appear on the November 3, 2020, general election ballot.

Following the previous election in 2018 and two announced vacancies (one from each party), Republicans had control of the Wisconsin State Senate with 18 seats against 13 held by Democrats. In the general election, Republicans picked up an open seat and defeated a Democratic incumbent to gain two seats in the chamber, leading to a 21-12 majority.

Predictions

Summary

Close races
Seats where the margin of victory was under 10%:
   
  
  (gain)

Candidates

Outgoing incumbents

Retiring
Luther Olsen (R–Ripon), representing District 14 since 2004, announced in February 2020 that he would not seek reelection, stating "there comes a time in life when it’s time to move on."
Mark F. Miller (D–Monona), representing District 16 since 2004, announced in January 2020 that he would not be running for reelection.
Fred Risser (D–Madison), representing District 26 since 1962, announced in March 2020 that he would be stepping down from the Legislature. Upon his retirement, Risser was the longest-serving lawmaker in American history, having served in the Wisconsin House of Representatives and Senate for 64 years.
Dave Craig (R–Vernon), representing District 28 since 2016, announced that he would not seek reelection to a second term in order to get "a break from public life."
Dave Hansen (D–Green Bay), representing District 30 since 2000, announced in January 2020 that he would be retiring to spend more time with his family.

Vacated office before term end
Tom Tiffany (R–Hazelhurst), who had represented District 12 since 2014, left office on May 18, 2020, after winning the special election for Wisconsin's 7th congressional district.
Jennifer Shilling (D–La Crosse), who had represented District 32 since 2011 and served as Minority Leader since 2015, resigned her seat on May 15, 2020 in order to explore "unspecified career opportunities."

See also
 Voter suppression in the United States 2019–2020: Wisconsin
 2020 Wisconsin elections
 2020 Wisconsin State Assembly election
 2020 Wisconsin Democratic presidential primary
 2020 Wisconsin Republican presidential primary
 2020 United States House of Representatives elections in Wisconsin
 2020 United States elections
 Wisconsin Senate
 Elections in Wisconsin

References

External links
 Wisconsin Elections Commission
 
 
 
  (State affiliate of the U.S. League of Women Voters)
 

2020 Wisconsin elections
Wisconsin State Senate elections
Wisconsin Senate